Shane Lowe is an Australian radio presenter and writer. He co-hosted Action Battle Team (radio) with former MTV presenter Maz Compton, and Dan Debuf, and is a former host of the breakfast show "Lewis & Lowe With Hayley Pearson" on Nova Adelaide Nova 91.9 with Dylan Lewis and Hayley Pearson.

He has been nominated three times for Best Music Personality at the Australian Radio Awards. He has presented his own What's On segment on Channel 9 Adelaide. He also has acted on television and has written opinion columns for News LTD Australia.

Lowe currently does Sundays on Adelaide radio station Mix 102.3 from 12pm

References

http://www.profiletalent.com.au/shane-lowe.html

http://www.nova919.com.au/nova919/shows/lewis-lowe

Australian radio presenters
Living people
Year of birth missing (living people)
Place of birth missing (living people)